Arthur and the Invisibles (known in Europe as Arthur and the Minimoys) is a video game based on the 2006 film of the same name by Luc Besson.

The game allows players to relive the fantastic adventure of Arthur and his two friends, Selenia and Bétamèche, in their mission to save the Minimoys' world from destruction. The game incorporates Besson's Minimoy universe and its inhabitants.

Gameplay revolves around the teamwork of the trio (Arthur, Selenia and Bétamèche): players can progress by combining the three characters' skills. These skills are expanded upon as the game progresses, ranging from detectors that allow to find the game's collectibles (Bétamèche), upgrading Selenia's dagger to The Sword of Power, and allowing Arthur to remove shields equipped by some enemies. A common puzzle throughout the game involves stacking pieces of a standing stone, called a "Flagstone", in order to open doors. Players also get the chance to stack on top of a Mogoth to cross razor-sharp stone pathways, as well as ride among monstrously huge spiders and ladybugs in order to access some areas.

The DS version of the game consists of playing a series of mini-games and raising pet mul-muls that can interact with those from other people's games.

Reception

The PlayStation 2 and PC versions of the game received somewhat favorable reviews. The DS version had mixed reviews, with its poorer graphics and comparatively easier gameplay. The Game Boy Advance version got poor reviews across the board, criticized for its poor graphics and soundtrack, extremely easy gameplay, and lack of content compared to the other versions. The PSP version did not receive much attention, due to its low production and the fact that its North American release was cancelled.

References

External links
 https://web.archive.org/web/20070202163445/http://atari.com.au/games/overview.do?id=562
 Blast Magazine review
 Search on IGN

2007 video games
Game Boy Advance games
Nintendo DS games
PlayStation 2 games
Neko Entertainment games
PlayStation Portable games
Video games developed in Canada
Video games developed in France
Windows games
Video games based on films
Single-player video games
Étranges Libellules games